Manuel II Palaiologos or Palaeologus (27 June 1350 – 21 July 1425) was Byzantine emperor from 1391 to 1425. Shortly before his death he was tonsured a monk and received the name Matthew. His wife Helena Dragaš saw to it that their sons, John VIII Palaiologos and Constantine XI Palaiologos, became emperors. He is commemorated by the Greek Orthodox Church on July 21.

Life

Manuel II Palaiologos was the second son of Emperor John V Palaiologos and his wife Helena Kantakouzene. Granted the title of despotēs by his father, the future Manuel II traveled west to seek support for the Byzantine Empire in 1365 and in 1370, serving as governor in Thessalonica from 1369. The failed attempt at usurpation by his older brother Andronikos IV Palaiologos in 1373 led to Manuel's being proclaimed heir and co-emperor of his father. He was crowned on 25 September 1373.

In 1376–1379 and again in 1390, Manuel and his father were supplanted by Andronikos IV and then his son John VII, but Manuel personally defeated his nephew with help from the Republic of Venice in 1390. Although John V had been restored, Manuel was forced to go as an honorary hostage to the court of the Ottoman Sultan Bayezid I at Prousa (Bursa). During his stay, Manuel was forced to participate in the Ottoman campaign that reduced Philadelpheia, the last Byzantine enclave in Anatolia.

Siege of Constantinople and letters to European courts
Having heard of his father's death in February 1391, Manuel II Palaiologos fled the Ottoman court and secured the capital against any potential claim by his nephew John VII. Following Manuel's coronation the Ottoman Sultan was initially content to leave Byzantium in comparative peace. However, in 1393 a large insurrection erupted in Bulgaria which, although successfully put down put down by the Ottomans, caused Bayezid to lapse into an episode of paranoia in which he believed his various Christian vassals were plotting against him. Bayezid called all his Christian vassals to a meeting at Serres, with the intention massacring them, a decision he relented on only at the last moment. The episode is said to have left all of the Christian vassal rulers shaken and convinced Manuel that continued appeasement towards the Ottomans was not a guarantee of his own personal safety or the continued survival of the empire and that efforts must be made to obtain Western aid.

Sultan Bayezid I blockaded Constantinople from 1394 to 1402. In the meantime, an anti-Ottoman crusade led by the Hungarian King Sigismund of Luxemburg failed at the Battle of Nicopolis on 25 September 1396. Manuel II had sent 10 ships to help in that Crusade. In October 1397, Theodore Kantakouzenos, Manuel's uncle, alongside John of Natala arrived at the court of Charles VI of France, bearing the Emperor's letters (dated 1 July 1397) requesting the French king's military aid. In addition, Charles also provided funds for the two nobles to treat with King Richard II of England in April 1398, with the aim of soliciting further aid. Though the latter was preoccupied by domestic troubles at this point to provide any support.

However, the two nobles returned home with the Marshal of France Jean II Le Maingre who was sent from Aigues-Mortes with six ships carrying 1,200 men to assist Manuel II. The Marshal encouraged the latter to go personally to seek assistance against the Ottoman Empire from the courts of western Europe. After some five years of siege, Manuel II entrusted the city to his nephew, aided by a French garrison of 300 men led by Seigneur Jean de Châteaumorand and embarked (along with a suite of 40 people) on a long trip abroad along with the Marshal.

Emperor's trip to the West
On 10 December 1399, Manuel II sailed to the Morea, where he left his wife and children with his brother Theodore I Palaiologos to be protected from his nephew's intentions. He later landed in Venice in April 1400, then he went to Padua, Vicenza and Pavia, until he reached Milan, where he met Duke Gian Galeazzo Visconti, and his close friend Manuel Chrysoloras. Afterwards, he met Charles VI of France at Charenton on 3 June 1400. During his stay in France, Manuel II continued to contact European monarchs.

According to Michel Pintoin who chronicled the visit to Paris:

In December 1400, he embarked to England to meet Henry IV of England who received him at Blackheath on the 21st of that month, making him the only Byzantine emperor ever to visit England, where he stayed at Eltham Palace until mid-February 1401, and a joust took place in his honour. In addition, he received £2,000, in which he acknowledged receipt of the funds in a Latin document and sealed it with his own golden bull.

Thomas Walsingham wrote about Manuel II's visit to England:

Moreover, Adam of Usk reported:

However, Manuel II sent a letter to his friend Manuel Chrysoloras, describing his visit to England:

Manuel II later returned to France with high hopes of substantial help and funds for Constantinople. In the meantime, he sent delegations with relics including pieces of the tunic of Christ and a piece of the Holy Sponge to Pope Boniface IX and Antipope Benedict XIII, Queen Margaret I of Denmark, king Martin of Aragon and king Charles III of Navarre to seek further assistance. He eventually left France on 23 November 1402, and finally returned to Constantinople in June 1403.

Renewed Ottoman sieges
The Ottomans under Bayezid I were themselves crushingly defeated by Timur at the Battle of Ankara in 1402. As the sons of Bayezid I struggled with each other over the succession in the Ottoman Interregnum, John VII was able to secure the return of the European coast of the Sea of Marmara and of Thessalonica to the Byzantine Empire in the Treaty of Gallipoli. When Manuel II returned home in 1403, his nephew duly surrendered control of Constantinople and received as a reward the governorship of newly recovered Thessalonica. The treaty also regained from the Ottomans Mesembria (1403–1453), Varna (1403–1415), and the Marmara coast from Scutari to Nicomedia (between 1403–1421).

However, Manuel II kept contact with Venice, Genoa, Paris and Aragon, by sending envoy Manuel Chrysoloras in 1407–8, pursuing to form a coalition against the Ottomans.

On 25 July 1414, with a fleet consisting of four galleys and two other vessels carrying contingents of infantry and cavalry, departed Constantinople for Thessalonica. The purpose of this force soon became clear when he made an unannounced stop at Thasos, a normally unimportant island which was then under threat from a son of the lord of Lesbos, Francesco Gattilusio. It took Manuel three months to reassert imperial authority on the island. Only then did he continue on to Thessalonica, where he was warmly met by his son Andronicus, who then governed the city.

In the spring of 1415, he and his soldiers left for the Peloponnese, arriving at the little port of Kenchreai on Good Friday, 29 March. Manuel II Palaiologos used his time there to bolster the defences of the Despotate of Morea, where the Byzantine Empire was actually expanding at the expense of the remnants of the Latin Empire. Here Manuel supervised the building of the Hexamilion (six-mile wall) across the Isthmus of Corinth, intended to defend the Peloponnese from the Ottomans.

Manuel II stood on friendly terms with the victor in the Ottoman civil war, Mehmed I (1402–1421), but his attempts to meddle in the next contested succession led to a new assault on Constantinople by Murad II (1421–1451) in 1422. During the last years of his life, Manuel II relinquished most official duties to his son and heir John VIII Palaiologos, and went back to the West searching for assistance against the Ottomans, this time to the King Sigismund of Hungary, staying for two months in his court of Buda. Sigismund (after suffering a defeat against the Turks in the Battle of Nicopolis in 1396) never rejected the possibility of fighting against the Ottoman Empire. However, with the Hussite wars in Bohemia, it was impossible to count on the Czech or German armies, and the Hungarian ones were needed to protect the Kingdom and control the religious conflicts. Unhappily Manuel returned home with empty hands from the Hungarian Kingdom, and in 1424 he and his son were forced to sign an unfavourable peace treaty with the Ottoman Turks, whereby the Byzantine Empire had to pay tribute to the sultan.

Death
Manuel II was paralyzed by a stroke on 1 October 1422, but his mind was unaffected and he continued to rule for three more years. He lived his last few days as a monk, taking the name of Matthew. He died on 21 July 1425, aged 75, and was buried at the Pantokrator Monastery in Constantinople.

Writings
Manuel II was the author of numerous works of varied character, including letters, poems, a Saint's Life, treatises on theology and rhetoric, and an epitaph for his brother Theodore I Palaiologos and a mirror of princes for his son and heir John. This mirror of princes has special value, because it is the last sample of this literary genre bequeathed to us by Byzantines.

Family

By his wife Helena Dragas, the daughter of the Serbian prince Constantine Dragas, Manuel II Palaiologos had several children, including:
A daughter. Mentioned as the eldest daughter but not named.
Constantine Palaiologos. Born ca. 1393/8, died before 1405 in Monemvasia.
John VIII Palaiologos (18 December 1392 – 31 October 1448). Byzantine emperor, 1425–1448.
Andronikos Palaiologos, Lord of Thessalonica (d. 1429).
A second daughter. Also not named in the text.
Theodore II Palaiologos, Lord of Morea (d. 1448).
Michael Palaiologos. Born 1406/7, died 1409/10 of the plague.
Constantine XI Dragases Palaiologos (8 February 1405 – 29 May 1453). Despotēs in the Morea and subsequently the last Byzantine emperor, 1448–1453.
Demetrios Palaiologos (c. 1407–1470). Despotēs in the Morea.
Thomas Palaiologos (c. 1409 – 12 May 1465). Despotēs in the Morea.

Ancestry

Pope Benedict XVI controversy

In a lecture delivered on 12 September 2006, Pope Benedict XVI quoted from a dialogue believed to have occurred in 1391 between Manuel II and a Persian scholar and recorded in a book by Manuel II (Dialogue 7 of Twenty-six Dialogues with a Persian) in which the Emperor stated: "Show me just what Muhammad brought that was new and there you will find things only evil and inhuman, such as his command to spread by the sword the faith he preached."

Gallery

See also

List of Byzantine emperors

Notes

References

Sources

Further reading
Manuel II Palaeologus Funeral Oration on His Brother Theodore. J. Chrysostomides (editor & translator). Association for Byzantine Research: Thessalonike, 1985.
 Manuel II Palaeologus, The Letters of Manuel II Palaeologus George T. Dennis (translator), Dumbarton Oaks, 1977. .
Çelik, Siren (2021). Manuel II Palaiologos (1350-1425): A Byzantine Emperor in a Time of Tumult. Cambridge University Press. 
 Karl Förstel (ed.): Manuel II. Palaiologos: Dialoge mit einem Muslim (Corpus Islamo-Christianum. Series Graeca 4). 3 vol.
 Jonathan Harris, The End of Byzantium. Yale University Press, 2010. 
 Florin Leonte, Rhetoric in Purple: The Renewal of Imperial Ideology in the Texts of Manuel II Palaiologos. PhD dissertation, Central European University, Budapest, 2012
 
  
 
 
George Sphrantzes. The Fall of the Byzantine Empire: A Chronicle by George Sphrantzes, 1401–1477. Marios Philippides (editor & translator). University of Massachusetts Press, 1980. .
 Erich Trapp: Manuel II. Palaiologos: Dialoge mit einem „Perser“. Verlag Böhlau, Wien 1966, . (German)
 Athanasios D. Angelou, Manuel Palaiologos, Dialogue with the Empress - Mother on Marriage. Introduction, Text and Translation, Vienna, Academie der Wissenschaft, Vienna 1991.

External links

 Encyclopedia of Roman Emperors entry
 Manuel Palaeologos Resources, including excerpts from his writings to his son John, on "the virtue of a king"
 Historical contemporary references to Manuel II  by the Byzantine Greek historian George Sphrantzes
 Portraits of Manuel II
 Dialogue 7 with a learned Persian – chapters 1–18 only.

1350 births
1425 deaths
14th-century Byzantine emperors
15th-century Byzantine emperors
Porphyrogennetoi
Byzantine governors of Thessalonica
Byzantine prisoners and detainees
Byzantine people of the Byzantine–Ottoman wars
Byzantine saints of the Eastern Orthodox Church
Eastern Orthodox monarchs
Manuel II
Eastern Orthodox theologians
14th-century Byzantine writers
15th-century Byzantine writers
Sons of Byzantine emperors